The 2000 WNBA season was the 1st season for the Portland Fire.

Offseason

Expansion Draft

WNBA Draft

Trades

Regular season

Season standings

Season schedule

Player stats

References

Portland Fire seasons
Portland
Portland Fire